Darenjan (also Romanized as Dārenjān; also known as Dārengān, Dārengūn, Dārenjān-e Sīākh, and Darinjān) is a village in Siyakh Darengun Rural District, in the Central District of Shiraz County, Fars Province, Iran. At the 2006 census, its population was 310, in 76 families.

References 

Populated places in Shiraz County